The Fokker S.II was a 1920s Dutch primary trainer built by the Fokker company for service with the Dutch Army.

Development
The S.II was designed by Reinhold Platz as the second Fokker primary trainer, but unlike the earlier S.I monoplane the S.II was an unequal-span single-bay biplane with a fixed cross-axle landing gear. It had side-by-side seating for an instructor and pupil and was originally powered by an 82 kW (110 hp) Thulin rotary engine. The engine was later replaced with a Le Rhone-Oberursel engine.

The aircraft was ordered by the LVA (Dutch Army Aviation) who purchased 15. One aircraft was modified to use a Curtiss OX-5 engine to elicit a response from the United States Army Air Service but they were not interested and the aircraft was returned to standard configuration.

Operation history
The 15 aircraft served with the Dutch Army until 1932 but one of the aircraft were converted to an Ambulance configuration and designated the S.IIA. It was still in service when German forces invaded the Netherlands in 1940. The S.IIA gained national notability in December 1933, when it was used for a mercy flight to carry two sick children and  a young woman to hospital.

Variants
S.II
Production version, 15 built.
S.IIA
One S.II modified to carry stretchers as an ambulance aircraft.

Operators

Dutch Army Aviation

Soviet Air Force - Two aircraft.

Specifications (S.II)

References

 The Illustrated Encyclopedia of Aircraft (Part Work 1982-1985), 1985, Orbis Publishing, Page 1899

1920s Dutch military trainer aircraft
S.II
Aircraft first flown in 1922
Biplanes
Single-engined tractor aircraft